The Industrial and Commercial Daily Press Limited was the editor and publisher of the three newspapers in British Hong Kong, The Kung Sheung Daily News, The Kung Sheung Evening News and The Tien Kwong Morning News. The company also wrote and published some special report, fiction and non-fiction.

The limited company was incorporated in 1928 and was winding up in 1996. The predecessor of the company was founded circa the same year with the daily newspaper in 1925. 

The company was located in Gage Street, and then on 43 Des Voeux Road Central, and then on 18 Fenwick Street, Wan Chai, all on Hong Kong Island.

History

Shareholders
According to the filings in the Hong Kong Companies Registry, the first available Annual Return (after World War II) in 1946, shown Sir Robert Hotung and his son  owned 500 out of 1,850 shares, Kwan Cho-yiu 140 shares, journalist Wu Dit Ng 50 shares, as well as other shareholders; the nominal largest shareholder was a corporate body "Sang Kee" for 1,000 shares. "Sang Kee", according to a biography of Ho Shai Lai, was one of the business of Ho Shai Lai.

The last Annual Return of the company in 1994, shown Ho Shai Lai and his wife, late Hesta Hung (d.1991) owned most of the shares, with his nephew Eric Hotung and a Liberia-incorporated as minority shareholders.

Books

References

Newspaper companies of Hong Kong
Publishing companies of Hong Kong
Defunct companies of Hong Kong
Publishing companies established in 1928
Publishing companies disestablished in 1996
1928 establishments in Hong Kong
1996 disestablishments in Hong Kong